Dercas is a genus of butterflies in the family Pieridae found in southeast Asia.

Species
Listed alphabetically:

Dercas enara Swinhoe, 1899
Dercas gobrias Hewitson, 1864
Dercas lycorias (Doubleday, 1842) – plain sulphur
Dercas nina Mell, 1913
Dercas verhuelli (Hoeven, 1839) – tailed sulphur

References

Coliadinae
Pieridae genera